Tomar-Re is a character appearing in comics published by DC Comics. He is a member of the Green Lantern Corps, as well as the predecessor and father of Tomar-Tu.

The character appeared in the 2011 Green Lantern film, voiced by Geoffrey Rush.

Publication history

Tomar-Re debuted in Green Lantern (vol. 2) #6 in a story written by John Broome with art by Gil Kane.

Character biography
Tomar-Re was a Xudarian, a race of aliens from the planet Xudar in Sector 2813 (in his first Pre-Crisis appearance he claimed it was Sector 9). He was a scientist on his homeworld before joining the Green Lantern Corps and becoming the Green Lantern of Sector 2813. Tomar-Re became a pivotal member of the Corps, training new members, like Arisia, and serving in the Honor Guard. He investigated reports of abuses of power by Sinestro on Korugar. He was close friends with Abin Sur, Green Lantern of neighboring sector 2814. He was also the first Lantern to meet Sur's replacement, Hal Jordan, and the two got along equally well. Pre-Crisis they first met when Tomar contacted Green Lantern about a threat to a world in his sector, which was happening at the same time alien invaders were attacking Tomar's world. Hal stopped the threat, then helped Tomar defeat the invaders, who hastily left the world. Hal first found out about the Guardians from Tomar, who mentioned they wanted the Green Lanterns to be equal which is why the Power Battery recharges their rings for the same time period. In the Post-Crisis timeline, that friendship is deepened further in that the rookie Jordan met him soon after being recruited. Jordan was brought to him by his power ring to help with his difficulties with handling the weapon and Tomar-Re not only guided the Terran to GLC headquarters for the optional training program, but also provided valuable emotional support during this difficult time.

Tomar's most famous mission while serving in the Corps dealt with the planet Krypton. Krypton, a planet in sector 2813, was growing increasingly unstable. It was due to explode, caused by internal pressures deep inside the planet's core. Tomar-Re sought to use a rare compound called stellarium to absorb some of the tectonic pressure, thus saving the Kryptonians. He gathered the compound, and was en route to Krypton when a yellow solar flare blinded him, and forced him to drop the stellarium. He quickly recovered, but discovered he was blind. He gathered what little stellarium he could without his sight, and proceeded towards Krypton. He was closing in when his vision started to clear. The first thing he saw upon his sight returning was Krypton exploding. The Guardians recovered Tomar and brought him back to Oa, where he healed and rested. Tomar-Re was not aware at the time that his temporary blindness was responsible for the creation of Superman.

He grew to be an honored senior member of the Corps, but his later career was not without cost. The most difficult moment was during the Nekron crisis when the death god used the spirit of Tomar-Re's deceased father to attempt to sway the Lantern to surrender. Although tempted, Tomar kept to his oath and destroyed his father's spirit to continue the battle, much to his personal anguish.

Tomar was retired when the Anti-Monitor sought to conquer the multiverse. He still served alongside the Corps, including John Stewart, who had become the GL for 2814. The war against the Anti-Monitor would be Tomar's final fight, as he was killed by the villain known as Goldface. This was part of a larger confrontation against the Weaponers of Qward. Before his death, Tomar-Re selected Stewart to be his replacement, thus forcing John's ring to go to Jordan, who had resigned from the Corps, and returning him to the organization. Years later, his son, Tomar-Tu, would follow his father's footsteps as a Green Lantern himself after getting his own ring.

Blackest Night

In the Blackest Night event, all of the fallen Green Lanterns in the Oan crypt were reanimated by black power rings. Tomar-Re is among the many Black Lanterns shown standing against the Green Lanterns on Oa.

After the events of the War of the Green Lanterns, Hal Jordan and Sinestro are trapped in the Dead Zone by the Guardians of the Universe (who have become unemotional), until they encounter a mysterious figure lurking in the zone observing them. This mysterious stranger says he was Hal's friend and Sinestro's enemy, and states that they are both dead. The mysterious stranger is revealed to be Tomar-Re (who was undead), asking Hal and Sinestro to stop Volthoom (The First Lantern), before he goes about bringing changes to reality in history. Hal and Sinestro are then confronted by the dead members in the Dead Zone. When Hal questions how Tomar-Re knew this, he explains that those beings who had died gathered information in the Dead Zone. Later, they are approached by Green Lantern Simon Baz who was transported by Black Hand to the Dead Zone and pulled him back after he split his ring which Sinestro claimed and unintentionally went with him, leaving Hal trapped in the Zone. Tomar views that Sinestro will not take Volthoom down easily. After Tomar unsuccessfully tries to persuade Hal from killing himself in order to gain a Black Lantern ring and escape the Dead Zone to stop Volthoom, he is pleasantly surprised when Hal's plan manages to succeed.

DC Rebirth

Subsequently, in DC Rebirth, when Hal Jordan is transported into the Emerald Space, where fallen Green Lantern officers go after being killed on duty, he meets Tomar-Re. He was encouraged and learned for his son, Tomar-Tu with Hal says that he has takes his father's predecessor of the Green Lantern Corps.

Other versions

Injustice: Gods Among Us
Tomar-Re appears in Injustice: Gods Among Us comic, patrolling his home planet of Xundar when he receives a message from his ring to return to Oa. Tomar-Re returns to Oa, and is one of the many Lanterns who chase and restrain Hal Jordan after the human's failed attempt to return to Earth. Tomar-Re then accompanies Kilowog along with a small group of Green Lanterns to Earth to apprehend Superman for trial. Tomar arrives on Earth along with Kilowog and the other Green Lanterns of his team in chapter nine, confronting Superman immediately. Before any of them can attack the Man of Steel, Tomar and the Lanterns are caught in a beam fired by Cyborg from the Watchtower. Tomar easily survived the beam thanks to his ring and gave the order, "Take them!" to his fellow Green Lanterns to battle with Hawkgirl and Shazam, with Tomar teaming up with Arisia to personally engage with Shazam. At some point, the Green Lanterns defeated the two, with Tomar having disarmed Hawkgirl of her mace. Before the Lanterns could take the three to Oa, Sinestro appeared and murdered Ch'p to the shock and horror of all present. In chapter eleven, Tomar is once more engaged in a battle with Hawkgirl, who had recovered her mace, and Tomar is on the defensive with Procanon Kaa quickly coming to his aide. Soon Tomar finds himself along with the rest of his fellow Green Lanterns surrounded by the newly arrived Sinestro Corps. In chapter twelve, Tomar surrenders his ring and allows himself to be taken as a prisoner of war on Earth alongside the rest of his fellow Lanterns on Kilowog's orders, sparing himself from death at the hands of the Sinestro Corps. Tomar's final fate is not known.

In other media

Television
 Tomar-Re makes a cameo appearance in the Superman: The Animated Series episode, "In Brightest Day...".
 Tomar-Re makes a cameo appearance in the Justice League two-part episode "In Blackest Night".
 Tomar-Re appears in the Justice League Unlimited episode "The Return".
 Tomar-Re appears in the Duck Dodgers episode "The Green Loontern", voiced by an uncredited Joe Alaskey.
 Tomar-Re is briefly seen in the episode "Ring Toss" of The Batman, voiced by Miguel Ferrer. Hal Jordan plays a recording for Batman in which Tomar relays the information about Sinestro's escape from prison.
 Tomar-Re appears in the Batman: The Brave and the Bold episode "The Eyes of Despero!". His home planet of Xudar also appears, being  taken over by Despero.
 Tomar-Re appears in Green Lantern: The Animated Series, voiced by Jeff Bennett.
 Tomar-Re appears in Young Justice: Phantoms, voiced by Dee Bradley Baker. His design in Young Justice is a combination of his designs from the comics and Green Lantern: The Animated Series. In the episode "Forbidden Secrets of Civilizations Past", it is mentioned that he was friends with Jor-El and Zor-El. He is killed by Lor-Zod in "Odyssey of Death!", with his ring being transferred to Forager.

Film

Live-action

 Tomar-Re appears in Green Lantern, voiced by Geoffrey Rush. As in the comics, he is the first Green Lantern that Hal Jordan meets upon recruitment, and he later rescues him alongside Sinestro and Kilowog after he is rendered unconscious upon defeating Parallax.
 In Justice League (2017), a scene depicting Green Lanterns Kilowog and Tomar-Re visiting Batman was filmed as an additional post-credits scene, further teasing the upcoming Green Lantern Corps, but the scene was later cut.

Animation
 John Larroquette voices Tomar-Re in Green Lantern: First Flight. He first appears alongside fellow Lanterns Boodikka, Kilowog, and Sinestro. In contrast to the comics, where he and Hal get along quickly, he immediately attacks Hal due to misunderstanding and treats him with hostility. During the course of events he is betrayed by Sinestro, who kills him using his newly obtained yellow ring.
 Tomar-Re appears in Green Lantern: Emerald Knights, voiced by James Arnold Taylor.
 Tomar-Re makes a brief appearance in Teen Titans Go! To the Movies.

Miscellaneous

In the comic book continuation of the television series Smallville, it is revealed that Tomar-Re attempted to stop the global civil war led by General Zod which cost him his life. His ring was inactive for years since his death, until it chose Clark Kent months after he became Superman.

References

Comics characters introduced in 1961
DC Comics aliens
DC Comics scientists
DC Comics superheroes
Fictional avatars
Characters created by Gil Kane
Characters created by John Broome
Green Lantern Corps officers
DC Comics extraterrestrial superheroes